Godfrey Mtenga (b. c. 1965) is a Zimbabwean sculptor.  A native of Chitaunhike in the Guruve district, he left school at 18 and began sculpting in 1987, working with Brighton Sango.  After six months, he started to work on his own.  He was featured in the Annual Exhibition at the National Gallery of Zimbabwe in 1989.

References
Biographical sketch

1965 births
Living people
20th-century Zimbabwean sculptors
21st-century Zimbabwean sculptors
People from Mashonaland Central Province
Date of birth missing (living people)